Beit Hall, forming part of Beit Quadrangle, is a hall of residence and one of Imperial College London's oldest and most historic buildings. Beit Hall is named after Alfred Beit and is located on Prince Consort Road, next to the Royal Albert Hall in London. The north side of the quadrangle forms the Union Building, home to Imperial College Union, and is not part of Beit Hall. The Union Building was the site of the first Queen concert, and has hosted events associated with the BBC Proms.

Beit Hall was built in 1910 on architect Aston Webb's designs to accommodate Imperial College students. Parts of the building were originally used for academic purposes. Two floors were added in the late 1950s and the building was entirely refurbished in 2001. It accommodates 300 students. During term-time, Beit Hall functions as student halls,
whilst during the remaining 14 weeks Beit becomes a conference centre and hotel. On the front façade is a relief of the coat of arms of Imperial College.

Books left by students in Beit were collected into a circulation library of around 400 items for personal reading in the Union Building in the mid-20th century. This later became the Haldane Library and is now part of the Central Library.

References

External links
 Beit Hall Accommodation site
 Imperial College Union site
 Imperial Venus site

Buildings and structures of Imperial College London
Cultural and educational buildings in London
Halls of residence in the United Kingdom